Good Times is the third studio album, and fifth album of new material released by the funk band Kool & the Gang. The album was released in November 1972, but did not make the Billboard R&B album chart until March 1973; peaking at number 34 during a 6 week run.

Track listing

Personnel 

 Dennis "D.T." Thomas – alto saxophone, vocals, flute, percussion
 Ronald Bell – tenor saxophone, soprano saxophone, vocals, alto flute
 Robert "Spike" Mickens – trumpet, vocals, flugelhorn, percussion
 Claydes Smith – electric guitar , acoustic guitar
 Rick West – acoustic piano, vocals, clavinet, ARP synthesizer
 Robert "Kool" Bell* – bass, vocals
 George Brown – drums, vocals, percussion

Additional Personnel
 Allen McGill – cello
 Billy Brown – French horn
 Sharon Moe – French horn
 Assunta Dell'Aquila – harp
 Marty Salyk – viola
 Sy Miroff – violin
 Al Wagner – violin
 San Zimmerman – violin

Production
 Produced and Arranged by Kool & The Gang
 Engineers – Tony Bongiovi and Jeff Lesser
 Recorded at Mediasound Studios (New York, NY)
 Artwork – Alfredo Seville
 Liner Notes – Norma Pinnella

References

1972 albums
Kool & the Gang albums
De-Lite Records albums